Gjømmervatnet is a lake that lies in the municipality of Bodø in Nordland county, Norway. The lake is regulated for use for the Oldereid Hydroelectric Power Station, northwest of Misvær.

See also
 List of lakes in Norway
 Geography of Norway

References

Lakes of Nordland
Bodø